Theanine , also known as L-γ-glutamylethylamide and N5-ethyl-L-glutamine, is an amino acid analogue of the proteinogenic amino acids L-glutamate and L-glutamine and is found primarily in particular plant and fungal species. It was discovered as a constituent of green tea in 1949; in 1950, it was isolated from gyokuro leaves. Theanine provides a unique brothy or savory (umami) flavor to green tea infusions.

The name theanine without a prefix generally implies the enantiomer, L-theanine, which is the form found in tea leaves and as a dietary supplement ingredient.  Most studies have used L-theanine. The opposite enantiomer, D-theanine, has been studied less.

The regulatory status of theanine varies by country.  In Japan, L-theanine has been approved for use in all foods, with some restrictions in the case of infant foods.  In the United States, the Food and Drug Administration (FDA) considers it to be generally recognized as safe (GRAS) and allows its sale as a dietary supplement.  The German Federal Institute for Risk Assessment, an agency of their Federal Ministry of Food and Agriculture, objects to the addition of L-theanine to beverages. In 2011 the European Food Safety Authority, when asked to provide a scientific opinion, concluded that a cause and effect relationship had not been established between consumption of L-theanine and improved cognitive function, alleviation of psychological stress, maintenance of normal sleep, or reduction of menstrual discomfort. Therefore, health claims for L-theanine are not recognized in the European Union.

Structure and properties
The chemical name N5-ethyl-L-glutamine and other synonyms (see box) for theanine reflect its chemical structure. The name theanine, without prefix, is generally understood to imply the L- (S-) enantiomer, derived from the related proteinogenic L-amino acid glutamic acid. Theanine is an analog of this amino acid, and its primary amide, L-glutamine (also a proteinogenic amino acid). Theanine is a derivative of glutamine that is ethylated on the amide nitrogen (as the name N5-ethyl-L-glutamine describes), or alternatively, to the amide formed from ethylamine and L-glutamic acid at its γ- (5-) side chain carboxylic acid group (as the name γ-L-glutamylethylamide describes).

Relative to theanine, the opposite (D-, R-) enantiomer is largely absent from the literature, except implicitly. While natural extracts that are not harshly treated are presumed to contain only the biosynthetic L- enantiomeric form, mishandled isolates and racemic chemical preparations of theanines necessarily contain both theanine and its D-enantiomer (and from racemic syntheses, in equal proportion), and studies have suggested that the D-isomer may actually predominate in some commercial supplement preparations. Amino acid racemization in aqueous media is a well-established chemical process promoted by elevated temperature and non-neutral pH values; prolonged heating of Camellia extracts—possible for oversteeped teas and in undisclosed commercial preparative processes—has been reported to result in increasing racemization of theanine to give increasing proportions of the nonnatural D-theanine, up to equal proportions of each enantiomer.

Discovery and distribution
Theanine is found primarily in plant and fungal species. It was discovered as a constituent of tea (Camellia sinensis) in 1949, and in 1950 a laboratory in Kyoto successfully isolated it from gyokuro leaf, which has high theanine content. Theanine is substantially present in black, green, and white teas from Camellia sinensis in quantities of about 1% of the dry weight. Deliberately shading tea plants from direct sunlight, as is done for matcha and gyokuro green tea, increases L-theanine content. The L-enantiomer is the form found in freshly prepared teas and some human dietary supplements.

Digestion and metabolism
As a structural analog of glutamate and glutamine, the theanine in preparations (teas, pure supplements, etc.) is absorbed in the small intestine after oral ingestion; its hydrolysis to L-glutamate and ethylamine occur both in the intestine and liver, so theanine can be considered to function as a donor that supplies glutamate to the body. Glutamate can be metabolized to glutamine in astrocytes, a process catalysed by Glutamine synthetase and can also be decarboxylated to GABA by Glutamate decarboxylase, thus theanine can supply the neurotransmitter pools of amino acids. It can also cross the blood–brain barrier intact, and register pharmacological effects directly.

Pharmacology

Pharmacodynamics
Theanine is structurally similar to the excitatory neurotransmitter glutamate, and in accordance, binds to glutamate receptors, though with much lower affinity in comparison. Specifically, it binds to ionotropic glutamate receptors in the micromolar range, including the AMPA and kainate receptors and, to a lesser extent, the NMDA receptor. It acts as an antagonist of the former two sites, and a partial co-agonist of the NMDA receptors. Theanine also binds to group I mGluRs. In addition, it inhibits glutamine transporters and glutamate transporters, and thus blocks the reuptake of glutamine and glutamate. Lastly, theanine elicits umami taste, and this effect has been found to be a consequence of the fact that it directly binds to and activates the T1R1 + T1R3 heterodimer or umami (savory) taste receptor.

Theanine increases serotonin, dopamine and glycine levels in various areas of the brain, as well as BDNF and NGF levels in certain brain areas. However, its effect on serotonin is still a matter of debate in the scientific community, with studies showing increases and decreases in brain serotonin levels using similar experimental protocols. It has also been found that injecting spontaneously hypertensive mice with theanine significantly lowered levels of 5-hydroxyindoles in the brain. Researchers also speculate that it may inhibit glutamate excitotoxicity.

Effects
A 2014 Natural Standard monograph that reviewed research on theanine reports that it is likely safe in doses of 200–250 mg up to a maximum daily dose of 1,200 mg.  Natural Standard rates the evidence to support the usage of theanine for anxiety reduction, blood pressure control, and mood improvement as "unclear or conflicting scientific evidence" and the evidence for improved cognition as "fair negative scientific evidence".   Many of the studies of theanine were done in combination with caffeine as found in tea.  While the studies found that the combination had some effect on mood, the studies found that theanine alone had little effect.

However a review by other researchers of a small set of trials concluded that there are benefits of L-theanine in reducing acute stress and anxiety in people with stressful conditions. and other subsequent studies have also concluded that it has an effect on reducing anxiety.

In 2011, the EFSA (European Food Safety Authority) intervened with a scientific opinion on the alleged properties of L-theanine (improvement of cognitive functions, alleviation of psychological stress, maintenance of normal sleep conditions, reduction of menstrual pain) and concluded that at present there is no scientific evidence of a cause-and-effect relationship between the intake of L-theanine and the indicated benefits.

Supplement use

A 2020 systematic review concluded that L-theanine supplementation between 200 and 400 mg per day may help reduce stress and anxiety acutely in people with acute stress, but there is insufficient evidence for treatment of chronic stress. It further concluded that longer term and larger clinical study is needed to clinically justify its use therapeutically.

In 2003, the German Federal Institute for Risk Assessment (Bundesinstitut für Risikobewertung, BfR) objected to the addition of isolated theanine to beverages. The institute stated the amount of theanine consumed by regular drinkers of tea or coffee is virtually impossible to determine. While it was estimated the quantity of green tea consumed by the average Japanese tea drinker per day contains about 20 mg of the substance, there are no studies measuring the amount of theanine being extracted by typical preparation methods, or the percentage lost by discarding the first infusion. Therefore, with the Japanese being exposed to possibly much less than 20 mg per day, and Europeans presumably even less, it was the opinion of the BfR that pharmacological reactions to drinks typically containing 50 mg of theanine per 500 milliliters could not be excluded—reactions such as impairment of psychomotor skills and amplification of the sedating effects of alcohol and hypnotics.

The combination of theanine and caffeine has been shown to promote faster simple reaction time, faster numeric working memory reaction time and improved sentence verification accuracy. Studies have also concluded that an L-theanine and caffeine combination have improved sustained attention, impulsivity and cognition in children diagnosed with ADHD.

Theanine has been reported to raise levels of brain serotonin and dopamine, with possible improvement in specific memory and learning tasks.

In brewed teabags
A study of teabags sold in British supermarkets in 2011 found that the teabags containing the most L-theanine per cup (24 mg versus 8 mg per cup) were the lower-quality brands containing black tea, with a supermarket brand of black tea having the highest theanine content.  The study demonstrates that brewing time is a major determinant of the amount of l-theanine extracted. Addition of sugar and small quantities of milk make no significant difference, while larger quantities of milk reduced the measured theanine content.

See also 
 gamma-Glutamylmethylamide
 Green tea

References

Further reading 

 
 

AMPA receptor antagonists
Anxiolytics
Carboxamides
Excitatory amino acid reuptake inhibitors
Kainate receptor antagonists
NMDA receptor agonists
Non-proteinogenic amino acids
Substances discovered in the 1940s